Necessary Roughness is a USA Network drama which premiered on June 29, 2011. The series stars Callie Thorne as Danielle Santino, a tough Long Island divorcee who, in order to make ends meet, gets a job as a therapist for a professional football team.

Series overview

Episodes

Season 1 (2011)

Season 2 (2012–13)

Season 3 (2013)

References

External links
Official website

Lists of American drama television series episodes